Bourecq is a commune in the Pas-de-Calais department in the Hauts-de-France region in northern France.

Geography

Population

Sights
 The church of St. Riquier, dating from the twentieth century.
 The remains of the chateau of Malannoy.
 An ancient 16th century manorhouse.

See also
Communes of the Pas-de-Calais department

References

Communes of Pas-de-Calais